Balista or Ballista (died c. 261), also known in the sources with the name of "Callistus", was one of the Thirty Tyrants of the controversial Historia Augusta, and supported the rebellion of the Macriani against Emperor Gallienus.

History 

Balista was the praetorian prefect under Valerian. After the Persian Empire defeated and captured that emperor in the Battle of Edessa, a body of Roman troops was rallied by a fiscal officer, Macrianus, and Balista. Joined, in some accounts, by Odaenathus, the Lord of Palmyra, they routed the Persian army that was returning from the ravaging of Cilicia. Then Macrianus proclaimed his sons, Macrianus Minor and Quietus, as emperors.

He stayed with Quietus in the East, while Macrianus and his elder son moved with the army against the West. In the Balkans, Macrianus were routed by the commander of Roman cavalry, Aureolus, a general loyal to Gallienus, and killed. Then, according to some accounts, Gallienus invited Odaenathus to turn against his former allies, Ballista and Quietus. Neither the time nor manner of Balista's death can be ascertained with certainty, but it is believed to have happened about November 261, and to have been contrived by Odaenathus. Another suggestion is that they were killed by their own men at Emesa.

In popular culture 
Balista, under the name Marcus Clodius Ballista is the hero of the Warrior of Rome Series by Harry Sidebottom.

Notes

References

 
 Bray, John. Gallienus : A Study in Reformist and Sexual Politics, Wakefield Press, Kent Town, 1997, 
 Körner, Christian, "Usurpers in the east: The Macriani and Ballista", s.v. "Usurpers under Gallienus", De Imperatoribus Romanis
 Potter, David S. The Roman Empire at Bay AD 180–395, Routledge, Oxon, 2004. 

Thirty Tyrants (Roman)
Gallienus usurpers
261 deaths
Praetorian prefects
Year of birth unknown
Year of death uncertain
Romans from unknown gentes
Generals of Valerian